A1 Team Mexico is the Mexican team of A1 Grand Prix, an international racing series.

Management 
A1 Team Mexico owners are Juan Cortina and Julio Jáuregui.

The technical assistance was initially provided by DAMS in 2005-06. However, new regulations brought in for 2006-07 stated that a racing team could not work with more than two A1 Teams. As DAMS worked with A1 Team France and South Africa in 2006–07, Mexico created a bespoke race team named Teamex to replace DAMS. In 2007–08, the team was run by Team Craft, while Escuderia del Mediterraneo took over for 2008–09.

History

2008–09 season 

Driver: Davíd Garza Pérez

2007–08 season 

Drivers: Salvador Durán, Davíd Garza Pérez, Jorge Goeters, Michel Jourdain Jr., David Martínez

Team Mexico were relatively uncompetitive in 2007–08. After scoring well in Zandvoort, the team only scored again twice, en route to 16th in the championship.

2006–07 season 

Drivers: Salvador Durán, Juan Pablo Garcia, David Martínez, Sergio Pérez

Again, mixed fortunes for the Mexican team. Four podiums in the early season, but no points after Indonesia, left them in 10th position in the championship.

2005–06 season 

Drivers: Luis Diaz, Salvador Durán, David Martínez

Mixed fortunes came over Team Mexico in the inaugural season. A clean sweep of the American rounds and three podiums, brought them to 10th place in the championship.

Drivers

Complete A1 Grand Prix results 

(key), "spr" indicate a Sprint Race, "fea" indicate a Main Race.

References

External links

A1gp.com Official A1 Grand Prix Web Site

Mexico A1 team
Mexican auto racing teams
National sports teams of Mexico
Auto racing teams established in 2005
Auto racing teams disestablished in 2009